The Portuguese local elections of 1997 took place on 14 December. The elections consisted of three separate elections in the 305 Portuguese municipalities, the election for the Municipal Chambers, whose winner is elected mayor, another election for the Municipal Assembly and a last one for the lower-level Parish Assembly, whose winner is elected parish president. This last was held separately in the more than 4,200 parishes around the country.

The Socialist Party (PS) maintained as the largest local political force, although only just, winning 128 cities, one more compared to 1993, and increasing their vote share to above 41%. In reality, PS and PSD basically tied in this elections, but the Socialists were able to hold on to big cities like Lisbon, Porto, Sintra and Coimbra. On the other hand, the PS lost some cities to the PSD, particularly Vila Nova de Gaia and Figueira da Foz, the latter won by Pedro Santana Lopes, future Lisbon mayor and Prime Minister.

The Social Democratic Party (PSD) made big gains, winning 11 cities and basically catching up with the Socialists. They also increased their share of vote to 35%. The PSD gained many cities from the PS, such as Bragança, Covilhã, Silves, Tavira and Alcobaça. Although the PSD didn't performed very strongly in the big urban centers, they performed extremely well in many medium and small cities across the country, but that same bad performance in the big urban centers, such as Lisbon and Porto, created criticisms to the leadership of Marcelo Rebelo de Sousa.

The election was quite bad for Democratic Unity Coalition (CDU), as they continued their fall in local politics. The Communist/Green coalition lost 8 cities and decreased their vote share to 12%. The CDU lost many of their bastions to the PS, such as Cuba, Amadora, Vila Franca de Xira and Sesimbra. They also saw a decrease in number of councillors, although here the fall was soft, as they lost just 10 councillors compared to 1993.

The People's Party (PP) also continued its decline in local politics. The party only won 8 cities, a fall of 5 cities, and dropped its share of the vote to the lowest level till that time, 5.7%. They lost big cities like Aveiro to the PS and Vila Verde to the PSD. One surprise in the elections was the victory of the People's Monarchist Party (PPM) in Penalva do Castelo, Viseu district, over the People's Party.

Turnout in these elections dropped in comparison with the 1993 election, as 60.1% of the electorate cast a ballot.

Parties 
The main political forces involved in the election were:

 People's Party (CDS–PP) (only in some municipalities)1, 
 Democratic Unity Coalition (CDU)2
 Socialist Party (PS)2
 Social Democratic Party (PSD) (only in some municipalities)1
 People's Monarchist Party (PPM)

1 The PSD and the CDS–PP formed coalitions in some municipalities. 
2 The PS formed a coalition with CDU and UDP in Lisbon.

Results

Municipal Councils

National summary of votes and seats

|-
! rowspan="2" colspan=2 style="background-color:#E9E9E9" align=left|Parties
! rowspan="2" style="background-color:#E9E9E9" align=right|Votes
! rowspan="2" style="background-color:#E9E9E9" align=right|%
! rowspan="2" style="background-color:#E9E9E9" align=right|±pp swing
! rowspan="2" style="background-color:#E9E9E9" align=right|Candidacies
! colspan="2" style="background-color:#E9E9E9" align="center"|Councillors
! colspan="2" style="background-color:#E9E9E9" align="center"|Mayors
|- style="background-color:#E9E9E9"
! style="background-color:#E9E9E9" align="center"|Total
! style="background-color:#E9E9E9" align="center"|±
! style="background-color:#E9E9E9" align="center"|Total
! style="background-color:#E9E9E9" align="center"|±
|-
| 
|2,041,307||38.07||2.0||||869||73||127||1
|-
| 
|1,761,383||32.85||0.9||||803||3||127||11
|-
| 
|643,956||12.01||0.8||||236||10||41||8
|-
| 
|302,763||5.65||2.8||||83||52||8||5
|-
|style="width: 10px" bgcolor=#FF66FF align="center" | 
|align=left|PS / CDU / UDP
|165,008||3.08||0.8||||10||7||1||0
|-
|style="width: 10px" bgcolor=#FF9900 align="center" | 
|align=left|Social Democratic / People's
|124,859||2.33||—||||7||—||0||—
|-
|style="width: 8px" bgcolor=#0093DD align="center" |
|align=left|People's / Social Democratic
|35,495||0.66||—||||4||—||0||—
|-
|style="width: 10px" bgcolor=#E2062C align="center" | 
|align=left|People's Democratic Union
|21,079||0.39||0.2||||0||0||0||0
|-
| 
|18,674||0.35||0.1||||0||0||0||0
|-
|style="width: 8px" bgcolor=red align="center" |
|align=left|PSR / Politics XXI
|9,175||0.17||—||||0||—||0||—
|-
| 
|9,126||0.17||—||||0||—||0||—
|- 
| 
|7,129||0.13||0.1||||5||5||1||1
|-
| 
|6,995||0.13||—||||1||—||0||—
|-
| 
|4,361||0.08||0.1||||1||1||0||0
|-
|style="width: 10px" bgcolor=#000080 align="center" | 
|align=left|National Solidarity
|2,301||0.04||0.5||||0||3||0||0
|-
| 
|1,884||0.04||0.4||||2||0||0||0
|-
| 
|1,483||0.03||0.0||||0||0||0||0
|-
| 
|567||0.01||0.0||||0||0||0||0
|-
|  
|120||0.00||—||||0||—||0||—
|-
|colspan=2 align=left style="background-color:#E9E9E9"|Total valid
|width="65" align="right" style="background-color:#E9E9E9"|5,157,665
|width="40" align="right" style="background-color:#E9E9E9"|96.18
|width="40" align="right" style="background-color:#E9E9E9"|0.4
|width="40" align="right" style="background-color:#E9E9E9"|—
|width="45" align="right" style="background-color:#E9E9E9"|2,021
|width="45" align="right" style="background-color:#E9E9E9"|6
|width="45" align="right" style="background-color:#E9E9E9"|305
|width="45" align="right" style="background-color:#E9E9E9"|0
|-
|colspan=2|Blank ballots
|117,360||2.19||0.3||colspan=6 rowspan=4|
|-
|colspan=2|Invalid ballots
|87,584||1.63||0.1
|-
|colspan=2 align=left style="background-color:#E9E9E9"|Total
|width="65" align="right" style="background-color:#E9E9E9"|5,362,609
|width="40" align="right" style="background-color:#E9E9E9"|100.00
|width="40" align="right" style="background-color:#E9E9E9"|
|-
|colspan=2|Registered voters/turnout
||8,922,182||60.12||3.3
|-
| colspan=11 align=left | Source: Comissão Nacional de Eleições
|}

Municipality map

City control
The following table lists party control in all district capitals, as well as in municipalities above 100,000 inhabitants. Population estimates from the 1991 Census.

Municipal Assemblies

National summary of votes and seats

|-
! rowspan="2" colspan=2 style="background-color:#E9E9E9" align=left|Parties
! rowspan="2" style="background-color:#E9E9E9" align=right|Votes
! rowspan="2" style="background-color:#E9E9E9" align=right|%
! rowspan="2" style="background-color:#E9E9E9" align=right|±pp swing
! rowspan="2" style="background-color:#E9E9E9" align=right|Candidacies
! colspan="2" style="background-color:#E9E9E9" align="center"|Mandates
|- style="background-color:#E9E9E9"
! style="background-color:#E9E9E9" align="center"|Total
! style="background-color:#E9E9E9" align="center"|±
|- 
| 
|align=right|2,030,025
|align=right|37.85
|align=right|2.2
|align=right|
|align=right|2,887
|align=right|258
|-
| 
|align=right|1,633,778
|align=right|30.46
|align=right|3.4
|align=right|
|align=right|2,579
|align=right|92
|-  
| 
|align=right|668,896	
|align=right|12.47
|align=right|0.6
|align=right|
|align=right|798
|align=right|5
|-
| 
|align=right|395,209
|align=right|7.37
|align=right|0.9
|align=right|
|align=right|437
|align=right|119
|-
|style="width: 10px" bgcolor=#FF66FF align="center" | 
|align=left|PS / CDU / UDP
|align=right|163,411
|align=right|3.05
|align=right|0.7
|align=right|
|align=right|30
|align=right|6
|-
|style="width: 10px" bgcolor=#FF9900 align="center" | 
|align=left|Social Democratic / People's
|align=right|124,472 	
|align=right|2.32
|align=right|—
|align=right|
|align=right|22
|align=right|—
|-
|style="width: 8px" bgcolor=#0093DD align="center" |
|align=left|People's / Social Democratic
|align=right|42,321	
|align=right|0.79
|align=right|—
|align=right|
|align=right|13
|align=right|—
|-
|style="width: 10px" bgcolor=#E2062C align="center" | 
|align=left|People's Democratic Union
|align=right|25,552
|align=right|0.48
|align=right|0.3
|align=right|
|align=right|2
|align=right|0
|-
| 
|align=right|12,309 	  	
|align=right|0.23
|align=right|0.0
|align=right|
|align=right|1
|align=right|0
|-
|style="width: 8px" bgcolor=red align="center" |
|align=left|PSR / Politics XXI
|align=right|11,150
|align=right|0.21
|align=right|—
|align=right|
|align=right|1
|align=right|—
|-
| 
|align=right|8,850
|align=right|0.16
|align=right|0.0
|align=right|
|align=right|1
|align=right|1
|-
| 
|align=right|6,483
|align=right| 0.12
|align=right|—
|align=right|
|align=right|8
|align=right|—
|-
| 
|align=right|6,008
|align=right|0.11
|align=right| 0.1
|align=right| 
|align=right| 16
|align=right| 16
|-
| 
|align=right| 4,254
|align=right| 0.08
|align=right|—
|align=right|
|align=right|5
|align=right|—
|-
|style="width: 10px" bgcolor=#000080 align="center" | 
|align=left|National Solidarity
|align=right|3,940
|align=right|0.07
|align=right|0.4
|align=right|
|align=right|0
|align=right|16
|-
| 
|align=right|1 844	
|align=right|0.03
|align=right|0.4
|align=right|
|align=right|5 
|align=right|6
|-
| 
|align=right| 1,341
|align=right| 0.03
|align=right|0.0
|align=right|
|align=right|2
|align=right|0.
|-
| 
|align=right| 576
|align=right| 0.01
|align=right|—
|align=right|
|align=right|0
|align=right|—
|-
|colspan=2 align=left style="background-color:#E9E9E9"|Total valid
|width="65" align="right" style="background-color:#E9E9E9"|5,140,419
|width="40" align="right" style="background-color:#E9E9E9"|95.83
|width="40" align="right" style="background-color:#E9E9E9"|0.5
|width="40" align="right" style="background-color:#E9E9E9"|—
|width="45" align="right" style="background-color:#E9E9E9"|6,807
|width="45" align="right" style="background-color:#E9E9E9"|38
|-
|colspan=2|Blank ballots
|135,738||2.53||0.4||colspan=6 rowspan=4|
|-
|colspan=2|Invalid ballots
|87,800||1.64||0.0
|-
|colspan=2 align=left style="background-color:#E9E9E9"|Total
|width="65" align="right" style="background-color:#E9E9E9"|5,363,957
|width="40" align="right" style="background-color:#E9E9E9"|100.00
|width="40" align="right" style="background-color:#E9E9E9"|
|-
|colspan=2|Registered voters/turnout
||8,922,182||60.12||3.3
|-
| colspan=11 align=left | Source: Comissão Nacional de Eleições
|}

Parish Assemblies

National summary of votes and seats

|-
! rowspan="2" colspan=2 style="background-color:#E9E9E9" align=left|Parties
! rowspan="2" style="background-color:#E9E9E9" align=right|Votes
! rowspan="2" style="background-color:#E9E9E9" align=right|%
! rowspan="2" style="background-color:#E9E9E9" align=right|±pp swing
! rowspan="2" style="background-color:#E9E9E9" align=right|Candidacies
! colspan="2" style="background-color:#E9E9E9" align="center"|Mandates
! colspan="2" style="background-color:#E9E9E9" align="center"|Presidents
|- style="background-color:#E9E9E9"
! style="background-color:#E9E9E9" align="center"|Total
! style="background-color:#E9E9E9" align="center"|±
! style="background-color:#E9E9E9" align="center"|Total
! style="background-color:#E9E9E9" align="center"|±
|-
| 
|1,952,468||36.56||2.0||||13,626||1,314||||
|-
| 
|1,615,100||30.24||3.4||||12,960||719||||
|-
| 
|661,254||12.38||0.9||||2,731||16||||
|-
| 
|287,724||5.39||2.4||||1,840||339||||
|-
|style="width: 10px" bgcolor=#FF9900 align="center" | 
|align=left|Social Democratic / People's
|206,839||3.87||—||||561||—||||—
|-
|style="width: 10px" bgcolor=#FF66FF align="center" | 
|align=left|PS / CDU / UDP
|169,893||3.18||0.7||||408||119||||
|-
|style="width: 8px" bgcolor=gray align="center" |
|align=left|Independents
|152,055||2.85||0.6||||1,594||360||||
|-
|style="width: 8px" bgcolor=#0093DD align="center" |
|align=left|People's / Social Democratic
|43,267||0.81||—||||77||—||||—
|-
|style="width: 10px" bgcolor=#E2062C align="center" | 
|align=left|People's Democratic Union
|16,116||0.30||0.2||||6||4||||
|-
| 
|5,501||0.10||0.1||||80||78||||
|-
| 
|4,575||0.09||0.0||||2||1||||
|-
| 
|3,162||0.06||0.2|||||39||1||||
|-
| 
|2 598||0.05||—||||8||—||||—
|-
|style="width: 10px" bgcolor=#000080 align="center" | 
|align=left|National Solidarity
|2,025||0.04||0.4||||6||10||||
|-
| 
|1 549||0.03||0.0||||9||7||||
|-
| 
|395||0.01||—||||3||—||||—
|-
| 
|394||0.01||—||||3||—||||—
|-
| 
|34||0.00||—||||0||—||||—
|-
|colspan=2 align=left style="background-color:#E9E9E9"|Total valid
|width="65" align="right" style="background-color:#E9E9E9"|5,124,949
|width="40" align="right" style="background-color:#E9E9E9"|96.05
|width="40" align="right" style="background-color:#E9E9E9"|0.6
|width="40" align="right" style="background-color:#E9E9E9"|—
|width="45" align="right" style="background-color:#E9E9E9"|33,953
|width="45" align="right" style="background-color:#E9E9E9"|495
|width="45" align="right" style="background-color:#E9E9E9"|
|width="45" align="right" style="background-color:#E9E9E9"|
|-
|colspan=2|Blank ballots
|119,778||2.24||0.4||colspan=6 rowspan=4|
|-
|colspan=2|Invalid ballots
|96,014||1.80||0.1
|-
|colspan=2 align=left style="background-color:#E9E9E9"|Total
|width="65" align="right" style="background-color:#E9E9E9"|5,340,741
|width="40" align="right" style="background-color:#E9E9E9"|100.00
|width="40" align="right" style="background-color:#E9E9E9"|
|-
|colspan=2|Registered voters/turnout
||8,922,182||59.86||3.3
|-
| colspan=11 align=left | Source: Comissão Nacional de Eleições 
|}

See also
 Politics of Portugal
 List of political parties in Portugal
 Elections in Portugal

References

External links
 Official results site, Portuguese Justice Ministry
 Portuguese Electoral Commission

1997 elections in Portugal
1997
December 1997 events in Europe